These 106 species belong to Capnia, a genus of small winter stoneflies in the family Capniidae.

Capnia species

 Capnia affinis Morton, 1896
 Capnia ahngeri Koponen, 1949
 Capnia aligera Zapekina-Dulkeit, 1975
 Capnia alternata Zapekina-Dulkeit, 1975
 Capnia ansobiensis Zhiltzova, 1974
 Capnia arensi Zhiltzova, 1964
 Capnia asakawaena Kohno, 1952
 Capnia atra Morton, 1896
 Capnia badakhshanica Zhiltzova, 1974
 Capnia bargusinica Zapekina-Dulkeit, 1975
 Capnia bicornata Alouf, 1992
 Capnia bicuspidata Zhiltzova, 1974
 Capnia bifida Jewett, 1960
 Capnia bimaculata Zhiltzova, 1969
 Capnia bituberculata Uéno, 1929
 Capnia breviptera Kawai, 1957
 Capnia californica Claassen, 1924
 Capnia caryi Baumann & Jacobi, 2002
 Capnia cheama Ricker, 1965
 Capnia coloradensis Claassen, 1937
 Capnia confusa Claassen, 1936
 Capnia cordata Kimmins, 1947
 Capnia elongata Claassen, 1924
 Capnia erecta Jewett, 1955
 Capnia excavata Claassen, 1924
 Capnia femina Kawai, 1968
 Capnia fialai Nelson & Baumann, 1990
 Capnia flebilis Kohno, 1952
 Capnia fukushimana Kohno, 1952
 Capnia gibbera Jewett, 1960
 Capnia giulianii Nelson & Baumann, 1987
 Capnia glabra Claassen, 1924
 Capnia gracilaria Claassen, 1924
 Capnia hamifera Zhiltzova, 1969
 Capnia hingstoni Kimmins, 1947
 Capnia hitchcocki Nelson & Baumann, 1987
 Capnia inyo Nelson & Baumann, 1987
 Capnia iturupiensis Zhiltzova, 1980
 Capnia jankowskajae Zhiltzova, 1974
 Capnia japonica Okamoto, 1922
 Capnia jewetti Frison, 1942
 Capnia kersti Nelson, 2004
 Capnia khubsugulica Zhiltzova & Varykhanova, 1987
 Capnia kibuneana Kawai, 1957
 Capnia kolymensis Zhiltzova, 1981
 Capnia kurnakovi Zhiltzova, 1978
 Capnia lacustra Jewett, 1965
 Capnia lepnevae Zapekina-Dulkeit, 1957
 Capnia levanidovae Kawai, 1969
 Capnia licina Jewett, 1954
 Capnia lineata Hanson, 1943
 Capnia longicauda Zhiltzova, 1969
 Capnia manii Jewett, 1958
 Capnia mariposa Nelson & Baumann, 1987
 Capnia melia Frison, 1942
 Capnia mitsuseana Hanada, 2018
 Capnia montana Kimmins, 1947
 Capnia montivaga Kimmins, 1947
 Capnia naebensis Kawai, 1967
 Capnia nana Claassen, 1924
 Capnia naraiensis Kawai, 1957
 Capnia nearctica Banks, 1919
 Capnia nelsoni Kondratieff & Baumann, 2002
 Capnia nigra (Pictet, 1833)
 Capnia noshaqensis Kawai, 1966
 Capnia oblata Chen & Du, 2017
 Capnia ophiona Nelson & Baumann, 1987
 Capnia oregona Frison, 1942
 Capnia pedestris Kimmins, 1947
 Capnia petila Jewett, 1954
 Capnia potikhae Zhiltzova, 1996
 Capnia prolongata Zhiltzova, 1969
 Capnia promota Frison, 1937
 Capnia pygmaea (Zetterstedt, 1840)
 Capnia qilianshana Li & Yang, 2009
 Capnia quadrituberosa Hitchcock, 1958
 Capnia rara Zapekina-Dulkeit, 1970
 Capnia regilla Nelson & Baumann, 1987
 Capnia saratoga Nelson & Baumann, 1987
 Capnia scobina Jewett, 1966
 Capnia sextuberculata Jewett, 1954
 Capnia shasta Nelson & Baumann, 2009
 Capnia shirahatae Kohno, 1952
 Capnia shugnanica Zhiltzova, 1974
 Capnia sidimiensis Zhiltzova, 1979
 Capnia singularis Zhiltzova, 1974
 Capnia spinulosa Claassen, 1937
 Capnia storkani Šámal, 1935
 Capnia takahashii Okamoto, 1922
 Capnia tibetana Kimmins, 1947
 Capnia triangulipennis Jewett, 1975
 Capnia trispinosa Chen & Du, 2017
 Capnia tshukotica Zhiltzova & Levanidova, 1978
 Capnia uintahi Gaufin, 1964
 Capnia umpqua Frison, 1942  (umpqua snowfly)
 Capnia valhalla Nelson & Baumann, 1987
 Capnia ventura Nelson & Baumann, 1987
 Capnia vernalis Newport, 1848
 Capnia vidua Klapálek, 1904
 Capnia willametta Jewett, 1955
 Capnia xiei Chen & Du, 2017
 Capnia yasumatsui (Kohno, 1951)
 Capnia yunnana Li & Yang, 2011
 Capnia zaicevi Klapálek, 1914
 Capnia zijinshana Du & Chen, 2016
 Capnia zukeli Hanson, 1943  (Idaho snowfly)

References

Capnia
Articles created by Qbugbot